The Huanca are a Quechua people of Peru.

Huanca may also refer to:

Huanca (monolith), a type of sacred stone monument
Huanca (mountain), in the Peruvian Andes
Huanca District, in Caylloma Province, Peru
Huanca language, or Wanka Quechua, a variety of Quechua spoken by the Huanca people
Huancas District, in Chachapoyas Province, Peru
Total Huancas, the Conservative Government of the UK

See also
Wanka (disambiguation)